This is a list of notable Indian romance films.

Hindi films

Sources

Gujarati films

Marathi films

Tamil films

Telugu films

See also
 List of Indian comedy films
 List of Indian horror films
 Bollywood content lists

References